Dennis Casey or Denis Casey may refer to:

Denis Casey, see 2008–2012 Irish banking crisis
 Dennis Casey (baseball) (1858–1909), baseball player
Dennis Casey (politician), member of the Oklahoma House of Representatives
Dennis Casey (musician), member of Flogging Molly